Vance Thomas Rider is an attorney who former Secretary of Labor and Human Resources of Puerto Rico under the governance of Alejandro García Padilla in the 16th Cabinet of Puerto Rico. Thomas was a former candidate for mayor of Culebra in 1992 for the Puerto Rican Independence Party and a former candidate for mayor of San Juan in 2000 for the same party. In 2012, however, Thomas favored García Padilla during the Puerto Rican General Elections although they are from different political parties. Thomas also led the Puerto Rico Commission on Civil Rights and the Puerto Rico Committee on the Conservation of Culebra's Seabed.

Thomas is a graduate from the University of Puerto Rico School of Law. Graduated from graduate school of Planning with courses for master's degree in environmental planning and a bachelor's degree in political science from the University of Puerto Rico.

References

Members of the 16th Cabinet of Puerto Rico
People from Jacksonville, Illinois
Secretaries of Labor and Human Resources of Puerto Rico
University of Puerto Rico alumni
Living people
Date of birth missing (living people)
Year of birth missing (living people)